Caecilia tentaculata is a species of caecilian (a group of serpentine amphibians) in the family Caeciliidae. It is found in Brazil, Colombia, Ecuador, French Guiana, Peru, Suriname, Venezuela, possibly Bolivia, and possibly Guyana. Its natural habitats are subtropical or tropical moist lowland forests, plantations, rural gardens, and heavily degraded former forest.

References

tentaculata
Amphibians of Brazil
Amphibians of Colombia
Amphibians of Ecuador
Amphibians of French Guiana
Amphibians of Peru
Amphibians of Suriname
Amphibians of Venezuela
Amphibians described in 1758
Taxa named by Carl Linnaeus
Taxonomy articles created by Polbot